Anderson Berlingueri dos Santos (born 24 July 1985) is a Brazilian mixed martial artist who competed in the Bantamweight division of the Ultimate Fighting Championship.

Mixed martial arts career

Early career

Starting his career in 2011, Anderson compiled a 20–6 record fighting mainly for a large variety of regional Brazilian shows, winning multiple titles. His most notable victory in this time was winning the Titan FC Bantamweight Championship by submitting fellow future UFC fighter Ricky Simón via rear-naked choke in the second round.

Ultimate Fighting Championship

dos Santos made his UFC debut as a replacement for Enrique Barzola against Nad Narimani on 17 November 2018, at UFC Fight Night: Magny vs. Ponzinibbio. He lost the fight via unanimous decision.

dos Santos faced Andre Ewell on 22 June 2019 at UFC Fight Night: Moicano vs. The Korean Zombie. He lost the fight via unanimous decision.

dos Santos was scheduled to face Jack Shore at UFC on ESPN: Kattar vs. Ige on 16 July 2020. However, dos Santos tested positive for COVID-19 before departing Brazil and was replaced by Aaron Phillips.

dos Santos faced Martin Day on 28 November 2020 at UFC on ESPN: Smith vs. Clark. He won the fight via first round guillotine choke. 

dos Santos was scheduled to face Miles Johns on 17 July 2021 at UFC on ESPN 26. However, the bout was removed hours before the show due to COVID-19 protocol issues stemming from Dos Santos' camp. The bout was rescheduled and eventually took place at UFC 265 on 7 August 2021.  dos Santos lost the fight via knockout in round three.

On 17 September 2021, it was announced that dos Santos was released by the UFC.

Post UFC 
After two wins on the Brazilian regional scene, dos Santos faced Evgeniy Ignatiev on August 26, 2022 at RCC 12. He lost the bout after getting knocked out in the first round.

dos Santos returned to the Brazilian regional scene, defeating Diego Barroso via arm-triangle choke in the third round at Thunder Fight 41.

Personal life
dos Santos and his wife have a daughter, and in 2021 he recently discovered he was a distant relative of current UFC fighter Rafael Dos Santos.

Championships and accomplishments
Titan Fighting Championships
Titan FC Bantamweight Championship (One time)
Circuito Talent de MMA
CT Bantamweight Championship (One time)
Coliseu Extreme Fight
CEF Interim Bantamweight Championship (One time)
Demolidor Fight MMA
DFMMA Featherweight Championship (One time)
California Cage Wars
CCW Bantamweight Championship (One time)

Mixed martial arts record

|-
|Win
|align=center|24–10
|Diego Barroso
|Submission (arm-triangle choke)
|Thunder Fight 41
|
|align=center|3
|align=center|3:22
|São Paulo, Brazil
|
|-
|Loss
|align=center|23–10
|Evgeniy Ignatiev
|KO (punch)
|RCC 12
|
|align=center|1
|align=center|4:37
|Yekaterinburg, Russia
|
|-
|Win
|align=center|23–9
|Helio Nunes
|Submission (rear-naked choke)
|FPC 1
|
|align=center|2
|align=center|1:29
|Bragança Paulista, Brazil
|
|-
|Win
|align=center| 22–9
|Edgar Oliveira
|Decision (unanimous)
|Demolidor Fight 17
|
|align=center|3
|align=center|5:00
|Bauru, Brazil
|
|-
|Loss
|align=center|21–9
|Miles Johns
|KO (punch)
|UFC 265 
|
|align=center|3
|align=center|1:16
|Houston, Texas, United States
|
|-
|Win
|align=center| 21–8
|Martin Day
|Submission (guillotine choke)
|UFC on ESPN: Smith vs. Clark
|
|align=center| 1
|align=center|4:35
|Las Vegas, Nevada, United States
| 
|-
|Loss
|align=center| 20–8
|Andre Ewell
|Decision (unanimous)
|UFC Fight Night: Moicano vs. The Korean Zombie
|
|align=center|3
|align=center|5:00
|Greenville, South Carolina, United States
|
|-
|Loss
|align=center| 20–7
|Nad Narimani
|Decision (unanimous)
|UFC Fight Night: Magny vs. Ponzinibbio
|
|align=center| 3
|align=center| 5:00
||Buenos Aires, Argentina
|
|-
|Win
|align=center| 20–6
|Aleandro Caetano
|Decision (unanimous)
|Thunder Fight 16: Rise of Immortals
|
|align=center| 3
|align=center| 5:00
|São Paulo, Brazil
|
|-
|Win
|align=center| 19–6
|Wanderley da Silva Ferreira Jr.
|TKO
|Standout Fighting Tournament 3
|
|align=center| 1
|align=center| 4:10
|São Paulo, Brazil
|
|-
|Win
|align=center|18–6
|Fard Muhammad
|Decision (unanimous)
|California Cage Wars 5
|
|align=center|5
|align=center|5:00
|Valley Center, California, United States
|
|-
| Loss
| align=center|17–6
| Victor Henry
| TKO (doctor stoppage)
| KOTC: Energetic Pursuit
| 
| align=center|2
| align=center|5:00
| Ontario, California, United States
|
|-
| Win
| align=center|17–5
| Claudio Aparecido Bertarello
| Submission (guillotine choke)
| Demolidor Fight MMA 10
| 
| align=center|1
| align=center|2:17
| Bauru, Brazil
|
|-
| Loss
| align=center|16–5
| Said Nurmagomedov
|Submission (guillotine choke)
|WFCA 35
|
|align=center|1
|align=center|1:52
|Astana, Kazakhstan
|
|-
| Win
| align=center| 16–4
| Josema Jose da Paz
| Submission (rear-naked choke)
| Katana Fight 1
| 
| align=center|2
| align=center|3:58
| Curitiba, Brazil
| 
|-
| Win
| align=center| 15–4
| Thiago dos Santos
| Submission (rear-naked choke)
| Gold Fight 8
| 
| align=center|1
| align=center|2:11
| São Paulo, Brazil
| 
|-
| Loss
| align=center| 14–4
| Andrew Whitney
| TKO (punches)
| Titan FC 40
|
|align=Center|2
|align=center|3:28
|Coral Gables, Florida, United States
| 
|-
| Win
| align=center| 14–3
| Ricky Simón
|Technical Submission (rear-naked choke)
|Titan FC 37
|
|align=center|2
|align=center|2:38
|Ridgefield, Washington, United States
|
|-
| Loss
| align=center| 13–3
| Josenaldo Silva
| TKO (punches)
| Jungle Fight 84
| 
| align=center| 3
| align=center| 1:40
| São Paulo, Brazil
| 
|-
| Win
| align=center| 13–2
| Mario Danilo
| Submission (rear-naked choke)
| Bison Kombat 1
| 
| align=center| 1
| align=center| 2:48
| Taboão da Serra, Brazil
| 
|-
| Loss
| align=center| 12–2
| Eduardo de Souza Silva
| Submission (guillotine choke)
| Coliseu Extreme Fight 12
| 
| align=center| 1
| align=center| 0:55
| Arapiraca, Brazil
|
|-
| Win
| align=center| 12–1
| Arivaldo Lima da Silva
| Submission (guillotine choke)
|Talent MMA Circuit 10
| 
| align=center| 1
| align=center| 4:40
| Osasco, Brazil
|
|-
| Win
| align=center| 11–1
| Michel de Oliveira
| Submission (rear-naked choke)
| Circuito de Lutas: Fight Night
| 
| align=center| 1
| align=center| 2:40
| São Paulo, Brazil
|
|-
| Win
| align=center|10–1
| Marcos Vinicius Borges
| KO (punch)
| Circuito Talent de MMA 6
| 
| align=center|1
| align=center|3:43
| Curitiba, Brazil
|
|-
| Win
| align=center|9–1
| Jose Alexandre
| KO (punch)
| Talent MMA Circuit 3
| 
| align=center|2
| align=center|1:40
| Guarulhos, Brazil
|
|-
| Win
| align=center|8–1
| Ricardo Sattelmayer
| Submission (armbar)
| X-Fight MMA 6
| 
| align=center|1
| align=center|3:03
| Matao, Brazil
|
|-
| Win
| align=center|7–1
| Leandro Souza Santos
| Submission (rear-naked choke)
| Bison FC 1
| 
| align=center|1
| align=center|2:59
| São Paulo, Brazil
|
|-
| Win
| align=center| 6–1
| Fernando da Silva Lima
| Submission (rear-naked choke)
| Talent MMA Circuit 1
| 
| align=center|2
| align=center|1:57
| Valinhos, Brazil
| 
|-
| Win
| align=center| 5–1
| Adilson Dias
| Decision (split)
| Supreme Fight Championship
|
|align=Center|3
|align=center|5:00
|Campinas, Brazil
| 
|-
| Win
| align=center| 4–1
| Edson Missio
| TKO (punches)
| Elite Fighting Championship 4
| 
| align=center| 1
| align=center| 3:10
| Valinhos, Brazil
| 
|-
| Loss
| align=center| 3–1
| Everaldo Souza
| Decision (unanimous)
| TC: The Coliseum 1
| 
| align=center| 3
| align=center| 5:00
| São Paulo, Brazil
| 
|-
| Win
| align=center| 3–0
| Cemir Silva
| Decision (split)
| Romani Fight Brasil 1
| 
| align=center| 3
| align=center| 5:00
| São Paulo, Brazil
| 
|-
| Win
| align=center| 2–0
| Jorge Andrade
| Submission (rear-naked choke)
| Morganti Contact Championship 2
| 
| align=center| 2
| align=center| 3:26
| São Paulo, Brazil
|
|-
| Win
| align=center| 1–0
| Ronielmo Lopes
| KO (punch)
| Fight Stars
| 
| align=center| 1
| align=center| 3:06
| São Paulo, Brazil
|

See also 
 List of current UFC fighters
 List of male mixed martial artists

References

External links 
  
  

1985 births
Living people
Brazilian male mixed martial artists
Bantamweight mixed martial artists
Mixed martial artists utilizing Brazilian jiu-jitsu
Ultimate Fighting Championship male fighters
Brazilian practitioners of Brazilian jiu-jitsu
People awarded a black belt in Brazilian jiu-jitsu
Sportspeople from São Paulo